Onne van der Wal is a Dutch marine photographer and writer.

Onne van der Wal Photography Gallery is named after him.

Early life and career 
van der Wal immigrated to South Africa in 1959. He spent his early life in apartheid South Africa.
He is trained as a machinist.

He started his career with Sail Magazine when they approached him to take photographs. He was on board Flyer II which won the 1981–1982 Whitbread Round the World Race.

In 1987, he moved to Newport, Rhode Island where he currently lives with his wife, Tenley, and three children.

Award 
 Photographic Society of America Award (2013)

Bibliography

References

External links
 PBS Documentary: Onne van der Wal
 Second Sail

Living people
Year of birth missing (living people)
Machinists
Dutch photographers
Dutch emigrants to South Africa